Reno is an unincorporated community in Grady County, in the U.S. state of Georgia.

History
A post office called Reno was established in 1911, and remained in operation until 1933. The community most likely was named after a local resident.

The Georgia General Assembly incorporated Reno as a town in 1913. The town's municipal charter was repealed in 1995.

References

Former municipalities in Georgia (U.S. state)
Unincorporated communities in Grady County, Georgia
Populated places disestablished in 1995